Mauro Bogado (born 31 May 1985 in San Martín, Buenos Aires) is an Argentine football player, who plays as a midfielder, who plays for Platense.

Career
Bogado began his career in 2006 with Argentinos Juniors. In 2008, he spent some time on loan to 2nd division side Instituto before returning to Argentinos.

In 2010 Bogado was signed by Chilean side Everton de Viña del Mar on a six-month loan deal.

References

External links
 Mauro Bogado – Argentine Primera statistics at Fútbol XXI 
 Guardian statistics
 

1985 births
Living people
Sportspeople from Buenos Aires Province
Argentine footballers
Argentine expatriate footballers
Association football midfielders
Argentinos Juniors footballers
Instituto footballers
Everton de Viña del Mar footballers
San Martín de San Juan footballers
Club Atlético Huracán footballers
Club Atlético Platense footballers
Argentine Primera División players
Argentine expatriate sportspeople in Chile
Expatriate footballers in Chile